Tessellana lagrecai, known as La Greca's slender bush-cricket, is a species of bush-cricket in the family Tettigoniidae. Described by Messina in 1979, the species is found in grasslands and shrublands in Sicily, Italy. It is considered a vulnerable species by the IUCN.

References

Insects described in 1979
Tettigoniinae